Mark Simon Austin Tanner (born November 1970) is a British Anglican bishop and academic. Since 2020, he has been the Bishop of Chester; he previously served as Bishop of Berwick, a suffragan bishop in the Diocese of Newcastle since his 2016 consecration as bishop; and from August 2011 until his consecration, he was the Warden of Cranmer Hall, Durham, a Church of England theological college.

Early life and education
Tanner was born in November 1970 in Canada to Professor Stuart Tanner and Joy Tanner. He was educated at Loughborough Grammar School, an all-boys private school in Loughborough, Leicestershire, England. He studied at Christ Church, Oxford, graduating with a Bachelor of Arts (BA) degree in 1992; as per tradition, his BA was promoted to an Oxford Master of Arts (MA Oxon) degree in 1997.

From 1992 to 1995, Tanner was a youth pastor at Holy Trinity Church, Coventry, West Midlands. In 1995, he matriculated into Cranmer Hall, Durham, an Anglican theological college, to train for ordained ministry. During this time, he also studied theology at St John's College, Durham, and graduated with a further BA degree in 1998. He later undertook postgraduate study at the University of Liverpool, and was awarded a Master of Theology (MTh) degree in 2005.

Ordained ministry
Tanner was ordained in the Church of England as a deacon in 1998, and as a priest on 3 July 1999 by Michael Langrish, Bishop of Birkenhead. From 1998 to 2001, he served his curacy at St Mary's Church, Upton, Merseyside in the Diocese of Chester. He then moved to the Diocese of Sheffield, and served as the vicar of St Mary's Church, Doncaster from 2001 to 2007.

In 2007, Tanner moved to the Diocese of Ripon and Leeds. He was vicar of Holy Trinity Church, Ripon from 2007 to 2011. He also held a number of positions in addition to his parish ministry. He was area dean of Ripon from 2009 to 2011. Since 2009, he has been an officiating chaplain to the military (OCM), a type of part-time military chaplain who remains a civilian, and served as OCM to 21 Engineer Regiment from 2009 to 2011.

In August 2011, Tanner became warden of Cranmer Hall, Durham, a Church of England theological college in the Open Evangelical tradition. He also served as OCM to 101st (Northumbrian) Regiment Royal Artillery from 2011 to 2013. In 2015, he was made an honorary canon of Durham Cathedral. During his five years at Cranmer Hall, he doubled the number of ordinands training there and oversaw the establishment of a training track for ministers from the free church, including those training for Baptist ordination.

Episcopal ministry
On 1 September 2016, it was announced that Tanner would become the next Bishop of Berwick, the suffragan bishop of the Diocese of Newcastle. On 18 October 2016, he was consecrated a bishop by John Sentamu, Archbishop of York during a service at York Minster. He was welcomed into the Diocese of Newcastle at St Nicholas' Cathedral, Newcastle on 3 December and at St Aidan's Church, Bamburgh on 4 December.

On 12 May 2020, it was announced that Tanner would become the next Bishop of Chester, the Ordinary of the Diocese of Chester. The confirmation of his election as Bishop of Chester, by which he legally took office, took place on 15 July 2020: it was undertaken online due to the COVID-19 pandemic.

Personal life
Since 1994, Mark Tanner is married to Lindsay, who is licensed as a Reader in the Church of England. Together they have two children.

Styles
 Mr Mark Tanner
 The Reverend Mark Tanner (1998–2015)
 The Reverend Canon Mark Tanner (2015–2016)
 The Right Reverend Mark Tanner (2016–present)

Selected works

References

1970 births
Living people
Church of England priests
20th-century English Anglican priests
21st-century English Anglican priests
Staff of Cranmer Hall, Durham
People educated at Loughborough Grammar School
Alumni of Christ Church, Oxford
Evangelical Anglican bishops
Alumni of Cranmer Hall, Durham
Alumni of St John's College, Durham
Alumni of the University of Liverpool
Bishops of Berwick
Bishops of Chester